Juan F. Bennett Drummond (June 7, 1864 - November 4, 1926) was an American physician. In 1888, she became the first African American woman to become a licensed doctor in the state of Massachusetts.

Biography 
Drummond was born on June 7, 1864 in New Bedford, Massachusetts. Drummond was a descendant of Paul Cuffe. She graduated 1883 from New Bedford High School and in 1888 graduated from the Women's Medical College of Pennsylvania.

Drummond ran her practice for 34 years, first starting to work from her home, and later from an office above the State Theater in New Bedford. She was the first African American woman to work as a licensed physician in Massachusetts. She was also involved with improving her community and one of the founders of the New Bedford Home for the Aged.

Drummond died in her home on November 4, 1926.

References 

1864 births
1926 deaths
African-American women physicians
People from New Bedford, Massachusetts
19th-century American women physicians
19th-century American physicians
20th-century American women physicians
20th-century American physicians
Woman's Medical College of Pennsylvania alumni
20th-century African-American women
20th-century African-American physicians